Keith Hatch (2 July 1916 – 30 October 2007) was a New Zealand cricketer. He played in five first-class matches for Wellington in 1945/46.

See also
 List of Wellington representative cricketers

References

External links
 

1916 births
2007 deaths
New Zealand cricketers
Wellington cricketers
People from Marton, New Zealand